Kazuki Watanabe (12 January 1987, Yokohama) is a Japanese swimmer. At the 2012 Summer Olympics, he competed in the Men's 200 metre backstroke, finishing in 6th place in the Olympic final.

References

Living people
Olympic swimmers of Japan
Swimmers at the 2012 Summer Olympics
Japanese male backstroke swimmers
Universiade medalists in swimming
1987 births
Sportspeople from Yokohama
Universiade bronze medalists for Japan
Medalists at the 2009 Summer Universiade
21st-century Japanese people